San Wai is an at-grade MTR Light Rail stop located at Tin King Road in Tuen Mun District, near San Wai Court. It began service on 24 September 1988 and belongs to Zone 3. It serves San Wai Court.

References

MTR Light Rail stops
Former Kowloon–Canton Railway stations
Tuen Mun District
Railway stations in Hong Kong opened in 1988
MTR Light Rail stops named from housing estates